Sam Mongin (born January 17, 1884 and died January 30, 1936) was a Negro leagues third baseman and second baseman for several years before the founding of the first Negro National League, and in its first few seasons.

Nicknamed "Polly," Mongin started playing semi-professional ball in the Savannah, Georgia area where he grew up as a teenager. He then played for the Atlanta Deppins and Chattanooga Giants before being picked up by the Philadelphia Giants at the age of 23.

During his career, it appears he spent the most seasons (five) for the Lincoln Giants.

While playing for the St. Louis Giants, Mongin met his wife. They married in 1914.

Mongin died at the age of 52 in New York, New York.

References

External links
 and Baseball-Reference Black Baseball stats and Seamheads

Lincoln Giants players
Philadelphia Giants players
Brooklyn Royal Giants players
St. Louis Giants players
Bacharach Giants players
1884 births
1936 deaths
20th-century African-American people
Baseball infielders
Burials at Cypress Hills Cemetery
African-American United States Army personnel
United States Army personnel of World War I